Chasmanthe bicolor is a plant species in the family Iridaceae.

References

Iridaceae
Plants described in 1832
Taxa named by N. E. Brown
Taxa named by Guglielmo Gasparrini